John Rory Barrett (born 31 December 1945) is a New Zealand weightlifter. He competed in the men's heavyweight event at the 1976 Summer Olympics. Barrett was a teacher at Lynfield College in the 1970s.

References

External links
 

1945 births
Living people
New Zealand male weightlifters
Olympic weightlifters of New Zealand
Weightlifters at the 1976 Summer Olympics
Sportspeople from Mumbai
Weightlifters at the 1978 Commonwealth Games
Weightlifters at the 1974 British Commonwealth Games
Commonwealth Games medallists in weightlifting
Commonwealth Games bronze medallists for New Zealand
20th-century New Zealand people
21st-century New Zealand people
Medallists at the 1974 British Commonwealth Games